The Grammy Award for Best Gospel/Contemporary Christian Music Performance is an award presented at the Grammy Awards, a ceremony that was established in 1958 and originally called the Gramophone Awards. According to the 54th Grammy Awards description guide it is designed for solo, duo/groups or collaborative (vocal or instrumental) gospel or Contemporary Christian music (CCM) and its subgenres' recordings and is limited to singles or tracks only.

This award was first handed out in 1968 under the name of Best Gospel Performance and was intended for albums only. 

In 1971 the award was renamed to Best Gospel Performance (other than soul gospel), including both singles and albums, and ran until 1978 when the award was divided into two new awards, the Grammy Awards for Best Gospel Performance, Traditional and Best Gospel Performance, Contemporary. 

The category was then revived in 2005 and it was known once again under the name of Best Gospel Performance. In 2012, following a major overhaul of the Grammy categories, this award was renamed as Best Gospel/Contemporary Christian Music Performance which was eligible for all subgenres in the gospel/Contemporary Christian Music (CCM) field. 

From 2015, due to a restructuring of the Gospel/Contemporary Christian Music category field, this category will merge with the Best Contemporary Christian Music Song to create the new Grammy Award for Best Contemporary Christian Music Performance/Song category, which will recognize both performers and songwriters of Contemporary Christian Music songs (Gospel performances will now fall under the Best Gospel Performance/Song category). According to the Grammy committee, "changes to the field were made in the interest of clarifying the criteria, representing the current culture and creative DNA of the gospel and Contemporary Christian Music communities, and better reflecting the diversity and authenticity of today's gospel music industry". 

The Blackwood Brothers hold the record for most awards in this category with four wins, two of them alongside Porter Wagoner. They also hold the record for most nominations, with seven. Two-time winners include Porter Wagoner, The Oak Ridge Boys, Karen Clark Sheard and CeCe Winans.

Recipients

See also
Grammy Award for Best Gospel Song
Grammy Award for Best Contemporary Christian Music Song
Grammy Award for Best Contemporary Christian Music Performance/Song

References

General
  Note: User must select the "Gospel" category as the genre under the search feature.

Specific

External links
 Official site

Gospel Contemporary Christian Music Performance
Grammy Awards for gospel music